Brian Christopher Mitchell (born 1953) is the president and managing principal of Academic Innovators. He is a nationally recognized expert on American higher education. Mitchell lectures widely and has served as a contributor for publications like The Huffington Post and Forbes. Mitchell's second book, "Leadership Matters," was also named by Forbes as one of the Top 10 Books in Higher Education.

Early life and education
A native of Lowell, Massachusetts, Mitchell graduated from Keith Academy and from Merrimack College.  He received his M.A. and PhD from the University of Rochester in American history, specializing in urban, ethnic and labor history.

Career
Mitchell began his teaching career at the University of Massachusetts (Lowell).  He also taught at Bentley College, Lesley University, New Hampshire College (now Southern New Hampshire University), and the University of Rochester.  Mitchell was chair of the Department of History at Anna Maria College.  

While teaching, Mitchell authored The Paddy Camps: The Irish of Lowell, 1821-1861, a critically-acclaimed book on the founding of the first Irish Catholic settlement in antebellum America’s largest planned industrial city.  

Mitchell left teaching to become a program officer in the Division of State Programs at the National Endowment for the Humanities in Washington, D.C.  Based in Washington, he worked primarily with humanities councils in the western US and also served as liaison to many of the academic professional associations, contributing to their published journals, articles, and newsletters.  Mitchell received an NEH award for Outstanding Performance in 1990.

He left the NEH to become president of the Council of Independent Colleges and Universities of Pennsylvania, a president-based collection of over 80 private colleges and universities, eventually merging it with the Foundation for Independent Colleges and Universities of Pennsylvania and the Pennsylvania Independent College and University Research Center to become the Association for Independent Colleges and Universities of Pennsylvania (AICUP).  This new state private college association worked on research, advocacy, communication and set up an ambitious member services program for its members.

While at AICUP, Mitchell worked to gain multi-year ten percent annual increases in the PHEAA (student aid) program, the second most generous in the country.  He was instrumental in getting House Bill 55, The Institutions of Purely Public Charity Act, unanimously passed by the Pennsylvania State House and Senate.  The bill provides uniform standards for determining the tax-exempt eligibility for all non-profits, including private colleges.  The bill passed in response to the City of Washington’s 1993 lawsuit against Washington & Jefferson College challenging the College’s tax-exempt status.  House Bill 55 clarified the law and has had a lasting impact on other non-profits besides private colleges, including hospitals, nursing homes, and public universities across the country.

Washington & Jefferson College

Shortly after the passage of this bill, Mitchell became president of Washington and Jefferson College.  He immediately began to work to improve town/gown relations.  To that end, Washington & Jefferson participated in a strategic initiative with Franklin & Marshall College, Michigan State and SUNY Geneseo to develop programs to connect institutions with their communities.  The Claude Worthington Benedum Foundation awarded W & J a grant to develop a coherent plan shortly thereafter.  The affected parties put forward workable plans capped by an “investors roundtable,” bringing together state and federal officials, bankers, community activists and potential investors.

While at W & J, Mitchell rebuilt the campus, planning and constructing new business and technology buildings, new residence halls and special purpose housing, the restoration of Cameron Stadium and the creation of a 7.6-acre artificial turf complex for football, soccer and lacrosse. He also created the Swanson Wellness Center and Brooks Park.  Mitchell supported a new liberal arts curriculum and added majors in biochemistry, child development and education, information technology leadership, international business, music, and theatre and communications.  During his tenure, W & J dropped the College’s acceptance rate to 40% and increased average SAT scores by 44 points.   During the comprehensive campaign, Mitchell raised an additional $84 million in new resources.

Bucknell University
Mitchell arrived at Bucknell and immediately worked on a new strategic plan, passed unanimously by the faculty, staff and trustees, developing a campus master facilities plan and a comprehensive capital campaign to support these ambitious efforts. He hired nearly 60 tenure-track professors in three years, lowering the student faculty ratio from 12/1 to 10/1.  Mitchell launched the University’s $500 million capital campaign, raising almost $170 million from all sources in 30 months during the height of the Great Recession.  Mitchell established the School of Management, now the College of Management, creating four new majors within it, the Bucknell Environmental Center, including building “Bucknell Landing” on the Susquehanna River, the Bucknell Institute for Public Policy, and the Teaching and Learning Center.  He merged academic and student affairs, approved a new curriculum for the College of Arts and Sciences, and fostered a strong Middle States University-wide reaccreditation and ABET accreditation for the College of Engineering.  In 2009, the Pennsylvania Chamber of Business and Industry named Bucknell one of the “best places to work in Pennsylvania” among the state’s top 50 large employers as ranked by employee surveys and a review of internal policies and practices.

Mitchell led the team that raised over $25 million to redefine town/gown relationships to create a new 28,000 sq. ft. University bookstore, new administrative offices in a renovated, working central post office, a restored art deco theatre, business incubator, and art space in downtown Lewisburg in four years from state, federal, and private sources.  He joined KINBER, a $128 million statewide federally funded, Pennsylvania-based broadband partnership to permit data intense research and link rural areas to the internet. Mitchell constructed or renovated the new state-of-the art soccer, field hockey and women’s lacrosse facilities, reconstructed the Burger Fitness Center, rebuilt the baseball and softball facilities, Rooke Chapel and refurbished most of the Elaine Langone Student Center.  He completed the planning and first fundraising for the new academic quadrangle and new student residential village.  Mitchell also opened three Posse chapters at Bucknell (Boston, Washington, DC and Los Angeles) and established the Bucknell Community College Scholars program.  Recognizing the University’s institutional strength in management and finances, Moody’s raised Bucknell’s bond rating to a strong Aa2 even before the University began its comprehensive campaign.

Awards and recognition 
Mitchell served as a trustee and the past chair of the Board of Trustees of Merrimack College. He is also a past chair of the Pennsylvania Selection Committee for the Rhodes Scholarships, the Patriot League Athletic Conference (Division I), the National Association of Independent College and University State Executives, the Association of Independent Colleges and Universities of Pennsylvania (AICUP) and the President’s Athletic Conference (Division III).   Additionally, Mitchell has served as a director of the National Merit Scholarship Corporation, the National Association of Independent Colleges and Universities, the Pennsylvania Humanities Council, the Pennsylvania Historical and Museum Commission, the Annapolis Group of 125 highly selective liberal arts colleges, and Geisinger Health System (annual revenue: $7.12 billion, 24,000 employees).  He currently serves on the board of Acadeum, an ed tech on line start-up in Austin, TX, and on the National Council on Arts, Sciences and Engineering at the University of Rochester. 

The POSSE Foundation awarded Mitchell the national POSSE Award for Outstanding Achievement in Education Through Leadership in 2010.  The Council of Independent Colleges and the Foundation for Independent Colleges presented him with the Charles W.L. Foreman Award for Innovation in Private Higher Education in 2011. Mitchell is the first recipient in arts and humanities of the Haskell Award for Distinguished Teaching at the University of Massachusetts at Lowell.  He has received numerous honorary degrees and scholarly awards, including those from the American Historical Association, American Council of Learned Societies, the National Endowment for the Humanities, and the U.S. Department of the Interior (National Park Service).   To honor his service to the 90 independent colleges and universities in Pennsylvania, his colleague presidents named both the boardroom in the AICUP building in Harrisburg in his honor in 1998 and the Association’s award for entrepreneurialism and creativity in building cooperative partnerships for him in 2014.

Publications 
Mitchell is the author of numerous articles, op eds and reviews.  He is widely quoted in the local, regional, state and national press.  From 2012- 2018, he contributed weekly higher education blogs for The Huffington Post and Academe (the journal of the American Association of University Professors).   Mitchell is a print and online contributor to College Management and Planning, University Business Magazine, Diverse Issues in Higher Education, Business Officers Magazine, FOX News Online, Trusteeship and WGBH, the national public television and radio station in Boston.

Johns Hopkins University Press published his recent book, co-authored with Dr. W. Joseph King, on How to Run a College: A Practical Guide for Trustees, Faculty, Administrators and Policymakers in January, 2018 which became an Amazon best-seller.  Together, Drs. King and Mitchell have just released their next book, Leadership Matters: Confronting the Challenges Facing Higher Education (Baltimore: Johns Hopkins University Press) on January 4, 2022.   

Dr. Mitchell speaks and lectures widely.

Later career
After retiring from Bucknell, Mitchell founded the Edvance Foundation to support more rational student transfer policies between two-year private and community colleges and four-year roivate colleges.  Supported by foundations and corporations, including the Jack Kent Cooke Foundation and the Bill & Melinda Gates Foundation, Edvance produced a major study of transfer pathway protocols and procedures at private colleges and universities in the United States – Strengthening the Transfer Pathway, with over 400 colleges and universities participating.  He also opened Brian Mitchell & Associates (2012-2017) which became Academic Innovators, where he continues to serve as managing principal and president.  Academic Innovators is a solutions company working in three areas: as short-term counsel and advisors to presidents, board chairs, trustees and senior higher education leadership, as facilitators for a group of twelve well-vetted “best practice” strategic partners to enhance sustainability and create efficiencies and economies of scale in American higher education, and as futurists and thought partners in social and print media to stabilize and promote higher education.

References

External links

Merrimack College alumni
University of Rochester alumni
Presidents of Washington & Jefferson College
Bucknell University faculty
Living people
University of Massachusetts Lowell faculty
Bentley University faculty
Lesley University faculty
University of Rochester faculty
1953 births
Anna Maria College faculty
George Mason University faculty
Southern New Hampshire University faculty
Presidents of Bucknell University